Frank Schmöller (born 21 August 1966) is a German football manager and former player.

Playing career
Schmöller played as a forward and during his thirteen year professional career, he appeared for seven different clubs in Germany and Belgium, most notably for Hamburger SV. With HSV, he won the DFB-Pokal in 1987, scoring two goals in the round of 16 win over rivals FC St. Pauli on 19 November 1986 and appearing in the final against Stuttgarter Kickers as a second-half substitute.

In total, Schmöller made 48 appearances in the Bundesliga, scoring 4 goals, and appeared a further 107 times in the 2. Bundesliga adding 26 goals.

Managerial career
After his playing career, he went into management, starting with lower-division Bavarian side SV Heimstetten in 2002. Most recently, he was the manager of TSV 1860 Munich II, a position he held from July 2019 until June 2021.

Honours
Hamburger SV
 DFB-Pokal: 1986–87

References

External links
 

1966 births
Living people
People from Eimsbüttel
Footballers from Hamburg
German footballers
Association football midfielders
Bundesliga players
Belgian Pro League players
2. Bundesliga players
SpVgg Unterhaching players
SC Fortuna Köln players
Hertha BSC players
Beerschot A.C. players
Lierse S.K. players
SV Waldhof Mannheim players
Hamburger SV players
German football managers
German expatriate footballers
German expatriate sportspeople in Belgium
Expatriate footballers in Belgium